Frespera is a genus of Venezuelan jumping spiders that was first described by A. Braul & A. A. Lise in 2002.  it contains only two species, found only in Venezuela: F. carinata and F. meridionalis.

References

External links
 Diagnostic drawings

Salticidae genera
Invertebrates of Venezuela
Salticidae
Spiders of South America